Gomteshwara Express is  an Express train belonging to South Western Railway zone of Indian Railways that run between  and  in India. The name of the train is derived from the Gommateshwara statue which is a 57-foot (17 m) high monolithic statue located on Vindyagiri at Shravanbelagola in the Indian state of Karnataka. This train is also called "Kudla Express''

Background
This train was inaugurated on 9 April 2017, From  flagged off by Suresh Prabhu (Former Minister of Railways) for Direct Connectivity between Mangalore and Bangalore via Shravanbelagola and the ghat section of Karnataka.

Service
The frequency of this train is tri-weekly and it covers the distance of 357 km with an average speed of 39 km/h.

Routes
This train passes through Chikkabanavara, Kunigal, Shravanabelagola,  and Sakleshpur on both sides.

Traction
As the route is not electrified so WDP-4D & WDM-3A pulls the train to its destination.

References

External links
 16575 Gomteshwara Express
 16576 Gomteshwara Express
 Vistadome coaches added from July 2021

Named passenger trains of India
Rail transport in Karnataka
Transport in Mangalore
Transport in Bangalore
Express trains in India